The 150th Pennsylvania House of Representatives District is located in Montgomery County and includes the following areas:

 Collegeville
 Lower Providence Township
 Skippack Township
 Upper Providence Township (PART)
 District Mingo [PART, Division 02] 
 District Trappe
 West Norriton Township (PART)
 District 01
 District 02 [PART, Division 01]
 District 03

Representatives

References

Government of Montgomery County, Pennsylvania
150